Majdan is a hamlet, a part of Cisna village, in the administrative district of Gmina Cisna, within Lesko County, Subcarpathian Voivodeship, in south-eastern Poland, close to the border with Slovakia.

The village has a population of 100.

In Majdan there is a main station and depot of Bieszczadzka Forest Railway.

References

Majdan